Justice Graham may refer to:

Patrick Graham (judge) (1906–1993), justice of the High Court of England and Wales
Peter Graham (judge) (born 1940), justice of the Federal Court of Australia
Warner A. Graham (1884–1934), justice of the Vermont Supreme Court

See also
Judge Graham (disambiguation)